ASH1L (also called huASH1, ASH1, ASH1L1, ASH1-like, or KMT2H) is a histone-lysine N-methyltransferase enzyme encoded by the ASH1L gene located at chromosomal band 1q22.  ASH1L is the human homolog of Drosophila Ash1 (absent, small, or homeotic-like).

Gene 
Ash1 was discovered as a gene causing an imaginal disc mutant phenotype in Drosophila.  Ash1 is a member of the trithorax-group (trxG) of proteins, a group of transcriptional activators that are involved in regulating Hox gene expression and body segment identity.  Drosophila Ash1 interacts with trithorax to regulate ultrabithorax expression.

The human ASH1L gene spans 227.5 kb on chromosome 1, band q22.  This region is rearranged in a variety of human cancers such as leukemia, non-Hodgkin’s lymphoma, and some solid tumors.  The gene is expressed in multiple tissues, with highest levels in brain, kidney, and heart, as a 10.5-kb mRNA transcript.

Structure 
Human ASH1L protein is 2969 amino acids long with a molecular weight of 333 kDa.  ASH1L has an associated with SET domain (AWS), a SET domain, a post-set domain, a bromodomain, a bromo-adjacent homology domain, and a plant homeodomain finger (PHD finger).  Human and Drosophila Ash1 share 66% and 77% similarity in their SET and PHD finger domains, respectively.  A bromodomain is not present in Drosophila Ash1.

The SET domain is responsible for ASH1L’s histone methyltransferase (HMTase) activity.  Unlike other proteins that contain a SET domain at their C terminus, ASH1L has a SET domain in the middle of the protein.  The crystal structure of the human ASH1L catalytic domain, including the AWS, SET, and post-SET domains, has been solved to 2.9 angstrom resolution.  The structure shows that the substrate binding pocket is blocked by a loop from the post-SET domain, and because mutation of the loop stimulates ASH1L HMTase activity, it was proposed that this loop serves a regulatory role.

Function 
The ASH1L protein is localized to intranuclear speckles and tight junctions, where it was hypothesized to function in adhesion-mediated signaling.  ChIP analysis demonstrated that ASH1L binds to the 5’-transcribed region of actively transcribed genes.  The chromatin occupancy of ASH1L mirrors that of the TrxG-related H3K4-HMTase MLL1, however ASH1L’s association with chromatin can occur independently of MLL1.  While ASH1L binds to the 5’-transcribed region of housekeeping genes, it is distributed across the entire transcribed region of Hox genes.  ASH1L is required for maximal expression and H3K4 methylation of HOXA6 and HOXA10.

A Hox promoter reporter construct in HeLa cells requires both MLL1 and ASH1L for activation, whereas MLL1 or ASH1L alone are not sufficient to activate transcription. The methyltransferase activity of ASH1L is not required for Hox gene activation but instead has repressive action.  Knockdown of ASH1L in K562 cells causes up-regulation of the ε-globin gene and down-regulation of myelomonocytic markers GPIIb and GPIIIa, and knockdown of ASH1L in lineage marker-negative hematopoietic progenitor cells skews differentiation from myelomonocytic towards lymphoid or erythroid lineages.  These results imply that ASH1L, like MLL1, facilitates myelomonocytic differentiation of hematopoietic stem cells.

The in vivo target for ASH1L’s HMTase activity has been a topic of some controversy.  Blobel’s group found that in vitro ASH1L methylates H3K4 peptides, and the distribution of ASH1L across transcribed genes resembles that of H3K4 levels.  In contrast, two other groups have found that ASH1L’s HMTase activity is directed toward H3K36, using nucleosomes as substrate.

Role in disease 
ASH1L has been implicated in facioscapulohumeral muscular dystrophy, a common autosomal-dominant myopathy in which patients experience progressive muscle wasting in the face, upper arm, and shoulder muscles.  At the molecular level, FSHD is associated with a lower-than-normal number of D4Z4 repeats at 4q35.  D4Z4 copy number reduction in FSHD patients causes insufficient binding of Polycomb-group repressors, permitting transcription of a long noncoding RNA called DBE-T that is encoded by a sequence within D4Z4 repeats.  DBE-T recruits ASH1L to the FSHD locus, resulting in H3K36 dimethylation, chromatin remodeling, and 4q35 gene de-repression.

References

External links

Further reading

Enzymes
Genes
Methylation